Vincenzo Millico (born 12 August 2000) is an Italian professional footballer who plays as a forward for  club Cagliari.

Club career
Born in Turin, Millico began playing football with local club Atletico Mirafiori and moved to Juventus at the age of 8. He then moved to Torino's academy at the age of 12. He made his professional debut for Torino in a 2–0 Serie A win over Atalanta on 23 February 2019. He scored his first goal on 1 August 2019, in a 4–1 win over Debrecen in the UEFA Europa League.

On 4 January 2021, Milico joined Frosinone in the Serie B on loan for the remainder of the season.

On 31 August 2021, he joined Cosenza on a season-long loan.

On 12 August 2022, Millico moved to Cagliari on a one-season contract, with the club holding an option to extend the contract by additional three seasons.

Career statistics

Club

Honours

Club
Torino
Coppa Italia Primavera: 2017–18
Supercoppa Primavera: 2018

References

External links
 
 
 Serie A Profile
 FIGC U17 Profile
 FIGC U19 Profile

2000 births
Living people
Footballers from Turin
Association football forwards
Italian footballers
Italy youth international footballers
Torino F.C. players
Frosinone Calcio players
Cosenza Calcio players
Cagliari Calcio players
Serie A players
Serie B players